Jamaica competed at the 2011 Pan American Games in Guadalajara, Mexico from October 14–30, 2011, with 58 athletes in 10 sports.

Medalists

Athletics

Men
Track and road events

Field events

Combined events

Women
Track and road events

Field events

Badminton

Jamaica has qualified two male and two female athletes in the badminton competition.

Men

Women

Mixed

Basketball

Women

Team

Shereel Brown
Zandria Dell
Nicole Dias
Sasha Dixon
Stacian Facey
Melissa Farquharson
Loretta Gordon
Simone Jackson
Tracey-Ann Kelly
Ladonna Lamonth
Shnell Moodie

Standings

Results

Seventh place match

Beach volleyball

Jamaica has qualified a men's team in the beach volleyball competition.

Boxing

Men

Cycling

Road Cycling

Men

Shooting

Men

Squash

Men

Swimming

Women

Taekwondo

Jamaica has qualified two athletes in the 68 kg and 80+kg men's categories.

Men

References

Nations at the 2011 Pan American Games
P
2011